Carnitine O-palmitoyltransferase 2, mitochondrial is an enzyme that in humans is encoded by the CPT2 gene.

Function 

Carnitine palmitoyltransferase II precursor (CPT2) is a mitochondrial membrane protein which is transported to the mitochondrial inner membrane. CPT2 together with carnitine palmitoyltransferase I oxidizes long-chain fatty acids in the mitochondria. Defects in this gene are associated with mitochondrial long-chain fatty-acid (LCFA) oxidation disorders and carnitine palmitoyltransferase II deficiency.

Model organisms
Model organisms have been used in the study of CPT2 function. A conditional knockout mouse line called Cpt2tm1b(KOMP)Wtsi was generated at the Wellcome Trust Sanger Institute. Male and female animals underwent a standardized phenotypic screen to determine the effects of deletion. Additional screens performed:  - In-depth immunological phenotyping

See also 
 Carnitine palmitoyltransferase I

References

Further reading 

 
 
 
 
 
 
 
 
 
 
 
 
 
 
 
 
 
 
 

Human proteins